David Dewaele (born 19 March 1976 in Hazebrouck, Nord-Pas-de-Calais as David Sébastien Dewaele; died 27 February 2013 in Hazebrouck) was a French actor.

Life and career 
In 2006 he met director Bruno Dumont, who engaged him for his movie Flanders. Dumont worked with Dewaele again in 2009 for his drama Hadewijch. In 2011 Dumont gave Dewaele his first lead role in his movie Outside Satan, in which Dewaele played the outsider Le Gars. The film was praised by critics of The New York Times and The Guardian.

On the 27 February 2013 David Dewaele died in his birth town after suffering a stroke.

Filmography 
2006: Flanders (Flandres)
2009: Hadewijch
2011: Outside Satan (Hors Satan)

External links 

Obituary: David Dewaele
Filmography in The New York Times

References 

People from Hazebrouck
1976 births
2013 deaths
French male child actors
French male film actors